The 2019–20 season was PAOK Football Club's 94th in existence and the club's 61st consecutive season in the top flight of Greek football. The team attempted to defend their Super League and Greek Football Cup titles won during the 2018–19 season, and also competed in the play-offs to qualify for the UEFA Europa League.

Coaching staff

Other information

|-

Players

Players in

Total spending:  €6.5M

Players out

Pre-season and other friendlies

Competitions

Overview

Managerial statistics

Last updated: 19 July 2020

Super League Greece

Results by round

Matches

• Man of the Match as has been voted by PAOK fans on official PAOK website and mobile app.

Play-off round
The top six teams from Regular season will meet twice (10 matches per team) for places in 2020–21 UEFA Champions League and 2020–21 UEFA Europa League as well as deciding the league champion.

Results by round

Matches

Greek Football Cup

PAOK entered the competition as the three-time defending champions, having won consecutive editions in 2016–17, 2017–18 and 2018–19.

Round of 16

Quarter-finals

Semi-finals

UEFA Champions League

Third qualifying round

UEFA Europa League

Qualifying rounds

Statistics

Squad statistics

! colspan="13" style="background:#DCDCDC; text-align:center" | Goalkeepers
|-

! colspan="13" style="background:#DCDCDC; text-align:center" | Defenders
|-

! colspan="13" style="background:#DCDCDC; text-align:center" | Midfielders
|-

! colspan="13" style="background:#DCDCDC; text-align:center" | Forwards
|-

! colspan="13" style="background:#DCDCDC; text-align:center" | Players transferred out during the season
|}

Goalscorers

Most assists

Clean sheets

Disciplinary record

Awards

Fans' Man of the Match award
As has been voted by PAOK fans on official PAOK website and mobile app.

Player of the Month award

Awarded monthly to the player that was chosen by fans voting on paokfc.gr

Season MVP award

Best Goal of the season award

References

External links
 PAOK FC official website

PAOK FC seasons
PAOK
PAOK FC